Daphnellopsis hypselos is a species of sea snail, a marine gastropod mollusk in the family Muricidae.

Description

Distribution

References

 Houart R. (1995["1994"]) The Ergalataxinae (Gastropoda, Muricidae) from the New Caledonia region with some comments on the subfamily and the description of thirteen new species from the Indo-West Pacific. Bulletin du Muséum National d'Histoire Naturelle, Paris, ser. 4, 16(A, 2-4): 245-297.
 Houart R. (2013) The genus Daphnellopsis (Gastropoda: Muricidae) in the Recent and Quaternary of the Indo-West Pacific province. Journal of Conchology 41(4): 465-480

Gastropods described in 1995
Daphnellopsis